Tekijuku (適塾) was a school established in , Osaka, the main trading route between Nagasaki and Edo in 1838 during the Tenpō era of the late Edo period. Its founder was Ogata Kōan, a doctor and scholar of Dutch studies (Rangaku). The foreign language curriculum focused primarily on medicine, but also taught astronomy and other western sciences.

The school was one of the predecessors of Osaka University and Keio University, through the work of the most notably alumni Ogata Koan and Fukuzawa Yukichi, respectively.

Graduates
Fukuzawa Yukichi
Hashimoto Sanai
Hanabusa Yoshitada
Ikeda Kensai（:ja:池田謙斎）
Ishizaka Ikan（:ja:石坂惟寛）
Ishida Eikichi（:ja:石田英吉）
Kusaka Genki（:ja:久坂玄機）
Mitsukuri Shūhei（:ja:箕作秋坪）
Nagayo Sensai
Ōmura Masujirō
Ōtori Keisuke
Sano Tsunetami
Takamatsu Ryōun (:ja:高松凌雲)
Takeda Ayasaburō
Tezuka Ryōsen (:ja:手塚良仙) - Great-grandfather of Tezuka Osamu
Tokoro Ikutaro（:ja:所郁太郎）

Transportation
Tekijku is within walking distance of the following train stations:
 Yodoyabashi Station  on the Keihan Railway Keihan Main Line and the Osaka Municipal Subway Midosuji Line
 Kitahama Station (Osaka) on the Keihan Railway Keihan Main Line and the Osaka Municipal Subway Sakaisuji Line
 Naniwabashi Station on the Keihan Nakanoshima Line

See also 
Kaitokudo
Osaka University

External links 

History of Osaka University
慶應義塾豆百科No.3 修復なった適塾 Keio University 
適塾と緒方洪庵 慶應義塾史跡めぐり Keio University 

Education in Osaka
Osaka University history
Rangaku
Keio University
Important Cultural Properties of Japan
Historic Sites of Japan